The following is a list of flags used in the Vatican City and its predecessor, the Papal States.

National flag and State flag

Papal flags

Military flag

Historical flags

See also
 Flag of Vatican City
 Coat of arms of Vatican City
 History of Christian flags

References

External links

Papacy
Flags of the Papacy
Flags of the Papacy